Jonathan David Jiménez Guzmán, known as Jonathan Jiménez (born 12 July 1992) is a Salvadoran professional footballer who plays as a midfielder for Primera División club Alianza.

International
He made his El Salvador national football team debut on 17 November 2015 in a World Cup qualifier against Canada, as a 64th-minute substitute for Dustin Corea.

He was selected for the country's 2019 CONCACAF Gold Cup squad, after remaining an unused stand-by player for the 2015 edition of the competition.

References

External links
 
 

1992 births
Sportspeople from San Salvador
Living people
Salvadoran footballers
El Salvador international footballers
Association football midfielders
C.D. FAS footballers
Alianza F.C. footballers
Primera División de Fútbol Profesional players
2019 CONCACAF Gold Cup players